The May 2014 San Diego County wildfires were a swarm of 20 wildfires that erupted during May 2014, in San Diego County, California, during severe Santa Ana Wind conditions, historic drought conditions, and a heat wave. The main event during mid-May was preceded by a precursor fire that ignited on May 5. The Bernardo Fire has been declared accidental, and officials believe the Cocos Fire was intentionally set. The causes of the other fires are still under investigation by multiple agencies, and a joint task force was formed to coordinate the investigations and facilitate communications. Six injuries and one fire-related fatality were reported.

At least eight major (named) fires were burning simultaneously at the height of the event, as well as several unnamed small brush fires. Smoke from the fires also prompted health advisories in parts of Orange and Los Angeles counties.

On May 14, the County of San Diego declared a local emergency. Later that evening, Governor Jerry Brown declared a state of emergency for the county and affected areas.

Multiple school districts, California State University at San Marcos, MiraCosta College, and Palomar College were forced to cancel classes and close schools for one or more days; CSUSM and Palomar also postponed or cancelled commencement exercises due to the fires. All evacuation orders were lifted by May 18, and all schools resumed classes on May 19.

The Cocos Fire was the last of the May 2014 wildfires to be extinguished, with full containment on May 22. Damage estimates were still being compiled as of late May 2014, but the County estimated that the fires cost close to $60 million (2014 USD), including $29.8 million in destruction or damage to private property, and $27.9 million in the costs of firefighting, support, and environmental damage.

Weather 
The May outbreak of fires occurred during a period of offshore flow throughout Southern California that meteorologist deemed highly unusual for the month of May. Beginning on May 11, the situation turned critical and red flag warnings went were issued across the region.

On May 17, the Santa Ana Winds subsided and temperatures started to drop.

Wildfires

Jacumba Fire
The Jacumba Fire was a precursor wildfire, which the preceded the main outbreak of wildfires that occurred a week later. At 4:36 PM PDT on May 5, the Jacumba Fire was reported off Interstate 8, east of McCain Valley Road.

Bernardo Fire

The Bernardo Fire in 4S Ranch, near Rancho Bernardo, started on May 13, at 10:00 AM PDT, just south of Del Norte High School, in a construction trench off Nighthawk Lane. The fire burned , before it was ultimately brought under control on May 17. The cause of the fire was ruled to be accidental; authorities said that it started in a small trench being dug by a construction crew, with sparks from a backhoe trencher setting off the fire, which spread rapidly through the dry brush at the site.

Tomahawk Fire

The Tomahawk Fire was the second-largest wildfire during the outbreak, behind the Pulgas Fire. The fire, which started May 14 around 9:45 AM, on the Naval Weapons Station Seal Beach Detachment Fallbrook (also known as Fallbrook Naval Weapons Station), scorched . The Fallbrook Naval Weapons Station is on the eastern side of, and provides an entry point to, Marine Corps Base Camp Pendleton and is adjacent to the community of Fallbrook.

Poinsettia Fire

The Poinsettia Fire was the second most destructive of the San Diego County wildfires. It caused property damage estimated at $22.5 million, as well as the only reported fatality in the San Diego County series of wildfires. As of July 10, 2014, the cause of the fire is listed as "undetermined", which allows for further investigation if more information comes to light.

Highway Fire
The Highway Fire near Bonsall and Fallbrook, started at 1 PM on May 14, near Interstate 15 and California State Route 76. Several schools and about 600 residents were evacuated.

River Fire
The River Fire broke out at 1:30 PM on May 14, in Oceanside, starting in the San Luis Rey River riverbed. Homes and an elementary school in the area were evacuated. The Oceanside Unified School District said that all schools would be closed on May 15. On May 16, it was reported that the River Fire was 100% contained, after it had burned  of land, confined to the river bed. A man was arrested on May 15 and charged with arson, after witnesses saw him adding brush to the flames, but authorities do not believe he actually started the fire.

Cocos Fire

The Cocos Fire, previously known as the Twin Oaks Fire, was a wildfire that ignited on May 14 in San Marcos, in the hills south of California State University, San Marcos. The Cocos Fire quickly spread into western Escondido. The fire destroyed more than 40 buildings, including a dozen single-family homes. Property damage from the fire is estimated at more than $5.7 million. Three minor injuries were reported. The Cocos Fire was finally extinguished on May 22, 2014.

Freeway Fire
Another wildfire, the Freeway Fire also started at the Naval Weapons Station area of Camp Pendleton. It was first reported at 5:43 PM on May 14. On May 16, the fire was 100% contained, after it had burned .

Aurora Fire
On May 14, at about 5:20 PM PDT, the Aurora Fire broke out near Interstate 8-Business and Aurora Drive, in Lakeside, prompting evacuation orders for the area around the fire.

Pulgas Fire

At 2:45 PM PDT on May 15, the Pulgas Fire broke out at Camp Pendleton near Interstate 5 at Las Pulgas Road, to the north of Oceanside. The fire quickly burned  acres within the next couple of hours.

San Mateo Fire
At around 11:24 PM PDT on May 16, Camp Pendleton reported a third wildfire on base. The fire was initially called the Talega Fire and later the Combat Fire by CAL FIRE, before finally being renamed to the San Mateo Fire. The fire started near the Camp Talega area of the base, near Basilone Road. Evacuation orders were given to personnel in nearby areas of the base including some housing facilities and a school. Late on May 20, the San Mateo Fire was reported to be 100% contained.

Other fires
An unnamed small brushfire started in the backyard of a home on Bear Valley Parkway in Escondido, at about 2 PM PDT on May 14. Homes were threatened, and the evacuations some of homes and businesses were ordered in the area of Bear Valley Parkway and Oak Hill. The fire destroyed one outbuilding and several vehicles.

On May 14, another small brush fire broke out in Escondido on the corner of El Norte Parkway and Nordahl Rd, which was also quickly extinguished.

On May 14, small brush fires also broke out in Lakeside and Scripps Ranch which were extinguished without causing structural damage or injuries.

Later on May 14, another small brush fire broke out in Poway, south of Painted Rock Elementary School, but was quickly extinguished.

On May 15, two teenagers were arrested and charged with arson for attempting to ignite two small brush fires, both of which were extinguished within minutes. Police had no evidence linking them to any of the actual major wildfires, and ultimately, no charges were filed against the suspects.

During the evening of May 15, a brush fire broke out close to Interstate 805 in National City near 45th Street; it was extinguished in about an hour.

At 8:00 AM PDT on May 17, a brush fire was reported in a canyon area northwest of Santee Lakes, called the Sycamore Fire. Several hours later, the fire was 100% contained.

See also

December 2017 Southern California wildfires
2016 California wildfires
2014 California wildfires
October 2007 California wildfires
2005 Labor Day brush fire
Cedar Fire (2003)
Climate change in California
List of California wildfires

References

External links
San Diego Wildfire Destruction Could Reach 30,000 Acres - TIME
RECENT FIRE SCARS HIGHLIGHT THE COMPLEXITY OF THE WILDLAND URBAN INTERFACE IN SOUTHERN CAL
Largest fires in San Diego County history - ABC 10News
Southern California's Worst Brush Fires

2014 California wildfires
Wildfires
Wildfires in San Diego County, California
2014 in California
May 2014 events in the United States